Radnor Township is located in Peoria County, Illinois. As of the 2010 census, its population was 3,613 and it contained 1,330 housing units. Radnor Township was named after Radnor, Pennsylvania.

Geography

Demographics

References

External links
City-data.com
Illinois State Archives

Townships in Peoria County, Illinois
Peoria metropolitan area, Illinois
Townships in Illinois